The 2018 Hamburg stabbing attack was an attack on 12 April 2018 in the city of Hamburg, Germany. A man stabbed his ex-wife and his one-year-old daughter on a station platform. Both victims died.

Attack
On the morning of 12 April 2018 the victims and the suspect met at the Stadthausbrücke station. The suspected assailant, Mourtala Madou, stabbed his ex-wife, identified as Sandra P., and their one-year-old daughter in the Jungfernstieg station of Hamburg S-Bahn near the Hamburg Rathaus and the mall of Europa Passage. The child died at the scene, the mother was taken to hospital, but died there later. One of the woman's children was also present. Several eyewitnesses were treated as well. The suspect called the police after the fact and was detained subsequently. According to prosecutors, the suspect acted out of outrage because a court had denied him custody of his children the day before the stabbing.

In May 2018, authorities released information indicating that the child had not been beheaded. Although the stab wound to the neck was lethal, the cause of death was another stab wound.

Suspect and motive
According to the prosecutor's office, the suspect acted in anger and revenge, because he had lost a custody dispute days before. If he had won, he might have been allowed to stay in Germany. He had been threatening the woman for some time, and she had made a complaint to the police. He was taken into custody and is charged with two counts of murder. The mother had four more children, who were taken into the care of the children's emergency service following their mother's death.

The suspect belonged to what is known in Hamburg as the "Lampedusa group", who came to the city via Italy in 2013, and had been granted a residence permit. and he was later residing in the public refugee housing in Wandsbek.

Trial 
The trial started in the Hamburger Landgericht in October 2018 where the suspect was charged with double murder. At the start of the trial the suspect confessed to the deed.

Reactions
A spokesman for Hamburg police, Timo Zill, called the crime "substantial" and "unusual for Hamburg". Katharina Fegebank, Deputy Mayor of Hamburg stated that she was shocked about the crime: "If a child is stabbed by the hand which should protect it, this exceeds any imaginable cruelty."

Many citizens of Hamburg brought flowers and candles and mourned at the place of the crime.

References

2010s in Hamburg
2018 in Germany
2018 murders in Germany
April 2018 crimes in Europe
April 2018 events in Germany
Deaths by stabbing in Germany
Familicides
Knife attacks
2018 stabbing attack
Murdered German children
Stabbing attacks in 2018
Stabbing attacks in Germany
Incidents of violence against girls
Incidents of violence against women